The 2003–04 Maltese FA Trophy was the 66th season since its establishment. The competition started on 1 November 2003 and ended on 18 May 2004 with the final, which Sliema Wanderers won 2-0 against Marsaxlokk.

First round

|colspan="3" style="background:#fcc;"|1 November 2003

|-
|colspan="3" style="background:#fcc;"|8 November 2003

|-
|colspan="3" style="background:#fcc;"|15 November 2003

|-
|colspan="3" style="background:#fcc;"|22 November 2003

|}

Second round

|colspan="3" style="background:#fcc;"|21 February 2004

|-
|colspan="3" style="background:#fcc;"|22 February 2004

|-
|colspan="3" style="background:#fcc;"|1 March 2004

|}

Quarter-finals

|colspan="3" style="background:#fcc;"|3 April 2004

|-
|colspan="3" style="background:#fcc;"|4 April 2004

|}

Semi-finals

Final

References

External links
 RSSSF page

Malta
Maltese FA Trophy seasons
Cup